Events in the year 2021 in Rwanda.

Incumbents
 President: Paul Kagame
 Prime Minister: Édouard Ngirente

Events
Ongoing — COVID-19 pandemic in Rwanda
5 March – Rwanda is the first African nation to receive the Pfizer–BioNTech COVID-19 vaccine. 102,960 doses of Pfizer and 240,000 doses of Oxford–AstraZeneca COVID-19 vaccine have arrived through the U.N. COVAX program. Rwanda has had 19,000 cases and 265 deaths related to the virus.

Scheduled events 
24 August to 5 September – Scheduled date for the AfroBasket 2021, to be hosted by Rwanda.

Deaths
February 22 – Seif Bamporiki, politician (Rwanda National Congress (RNC); killed during a robbery in South Africa

See also

International Conference on the Great Lakes Region
COVID-19 pandemic in Africa

References

 
2020s in Rwanda
Years of the 21st century in Rwanda
Rwanda
Rwanda